The Ammonellipsitinae  is a subfamily (one of two) within the Pericyclidae, a family within the goniatitid superfamily Pericycloidea from the Lower Carboniferous (Mississippian) characterized by having a suture in which the sides of the ventral lobe diverge and the  first lateral saddle is acute or subacute, and in which the immature and juvenile shell has a wide umbilicus.

Of the four genera so far included, Fascipericyclus, Helicocyclus, and Stenocyclus were once considered subgenera of Pericyclus. The type genus, Ammonellisites was also included in the older Pericylitinae that was part of the Goniatitidae in Miller et al. (1960)

Ammonellipsitinae have been found mostly in Europe but some have been found in North America (US) as well

References
 Miller, Furnish, and Schindewolf (1960) ; Paleozoic Ammonoidea, in the Treatise on Invertebrate Paleontology, Part L, Ammonoidea; Geological Soc. of America and Univ of Kansas.
 .

Pericyclidae
Fossil taxa described in 1996